Juan Gualberto Guevara B.A. J.C.D. (12 July 1882 – 27 November 1954) was created on 18 February 1946 a Cardinal Priest by Pope Pius XII. He was Archbishop of Lima in the Roman Catholic Church. He was the first Cardinal of Peru.

Biography

Early life and education

He was born in Villa de Vitor in the Archdiocese of Arequipa. Educated at the Seminary of San Jerónimo, Arequipa and University of San Agustin. Graduated in 1912 with a Bachelor of Arts degree. Finally went to the Pontifical Gregorian University in Rome, where in 1922 he earned a doctorate in canon law.

Priesthood
He was ordained on 2 June 1906 in Arequipa and worked as a parish priest from 1906 until 1910 in Arica, nowadays in Chile. He was expelled by the Chilean Government when it claimed the province that he was working in. He became Vice-rector of the Seminary of Arequipa, in 1910, where he stayed for ten years until 1920.  He was named sacristan of the cathedral of Arequipa  1916 - 1920. He worked as staff member of El Deber, oldest newspaper in southern Peru, 1916–1940 and its director 1928 - 1940.

Episcopate
Guevara was appointed Bishop of Trujillo by Pope Pius XII on 15 December 1940. When the diocese of Trujillo was elevated to an archdiocese he became its first archbishop on 23 May 1943. Appointed as Military Vicars of Peru  on 13 January 1945 and retained that office until his death. Transferred to the metropolitan see of Lima on 16 December 1945.

Cardinalate

Pope Pius XII created him Cardinal Priest of Sant'Eusebio in the consistory of 18 February 1946. He was thus the first Peruvian cardinal ever created. Died in 1954 of cancer in Lima. Buried in the metropolitan cathedral of Lima.

Trivia
Guevara once told several mothers of bathing-suit parade contestants that such a parade would be contrary to religion and modesty.

References

External links
The Cardinals of the Holy Roman Church - Biographical Dictionary
Catholic Hierarchy data for this cardinal

1882 births
1954 deaths
Cardinals created by Pope Pius XII
Peruvian cardinals
20th-century Roman Catholic archbishops in Peru
Burials at the Cathedral of Lima
Roman Catholic archbishops of Trujillo
Roman Catholic archbishops of Lima